The Central Manitoba Railway  is a Canadian shortline railway operating in the province of Manitoba.

The Central Manitoba Railway (CEMR) was created in 1999 by Cando Rail & Terminals to purchase the former CN Pine Falls and Carman subdivisions. They run five days a week (weekdays) in the Norcran Industrial Area in North Transcona. They purchased a former CPR yard that was built in 1887–9 and built a new shop-house and diesel repair facility. They also repair cars for other railways.

They run on 115 & 132 pound per yard (50 kg/m) rail on the Carman sub, and 85 pound per yard (42 kg/m) light rail on the Pine Falls sub, one of the few light rail branches existing in Manitoba.

Livery

1999 - December 2017 

A black top and bottom broken by red and white stripes down the middle with the CEMR "bison" logo and a larger grey stripe and large white engine numbers on the sides under the windows of the cab.

December 2017 - Present 

Solid black with red and white curved stripes near the rear and on the nose of the locomotive, and a red line on the fuel tank. This base scheme, and the font of the numbers, match that of the CEMR's parent company, Cando Rail & Terminals. In the middle of the body is the CEMR "bison" logo, with the website of Cando underneath.

All-Time Locomotives
The Central Manitoba Railway currently operates 16 locomotives.

Red =

Gallery

References

External links

 Central Manitoba Railway 
 Traingeek's page on Central Manitoba Railway

Manitoba railways